The Titan Tornado is large family of cantilever high-wing, pusher configuration, tricycle gear-equipped kit aircraft manufactured by Titan Aircraft of Austinburg, Ohio, for amateur construction.

Design and development
The first in the Tornado series, the Tornado 103, which started development in 1990, was introduced in 1994 and designed to fit into the US FAR 103 Ultralight Vehicles category, meeting the  empty weight limit. If equipped with a light enough engine the Tornado 103 could qualify as a US ultralight.

The Tornado borrows from the design of the Earthstar Thunder Gull J and shares a similar cantilever wing of small area, keeping stall speeds low by use of flaps. This low drag design manages high cross country speeds as a result. The cockpit is constructed from 4130 steel, while the fuselage boom tube and the wings are built from aluminium. Unlike the Gull's wing, which is aircraft fabric-covered or optionally finished in sheet aluminium, the Tornado's wing is stressed skin. The Tornado has a tricycle undercarriage with a supplemental tailwheel castor, as the aircraft sits on its tail when unoccupied.

Operational history
The Tornado 103 was named Ultralight Grand Champion at Sun 'n Fun 1994.

Variants
Tornado 103
The first version, a single seater, intended for the US ultralight category with a  wingspan. Standard engine was the  Rotax 277. No longer in production. Reported construction time is 300 hours. Ten were reported flying in 1998.
Tornado Sport
Improved single seater version intended for the US homebuilt category with a  wingspan. Standard engine is the  Rotax 503. No longer in production. Reported construction time is 300 hours. 89 were reported flying in 1999.
Tornado MG
Single seater version intended for the US homebuilt category, with a  wingspan. The wing is detachable for storage or transport. Standard engine is the  Rotax 447 and optional engines included the  Rotax 503,  Rotax 582,  Rotax 618 and the  Rotax 912UL. No longer in production. Reported construction time is 350 hours. Five were reported flying in 2011.
Tornado I
Standard engine is the  Rotax 503. Still in production.
Tornado I Sport
Standard engine is the  Rotax 503. No longer in production. 180 were reported flying in 2011.

Tornado II
Two seats in tandem version, intended for the previous US ultralight trainer category and presently for the US homebuilt and light-sport categories. It has a  wingspan. The  HKS 700E four-stroke engine has also been used. Still in production. Reported construction time is 350 hours. 120 were reported flying in 1998.
Tornado II Trainer
Two seats in tandem version, intended for the previous US ultralight trainer category. It has a  wingspan. Standard engine is the  Rotax 582. No longer in production. Reported construction time is 350 hours. 510 were reported flying in 2011.
Tornado II Sport
Two seats in tandem version, intended for the US homebuilt category. It has a  wingspan. Standard engine is the  Rotax 912UL. No longer in production. Reported construction time is 350 hours. 500 were reported flying in 2003.
Tornado II 912
Two seats in tandem version, intended for the US homebuilt category. It has a  wingspan. No longer in production. 145 were reported flying in 1999.
Tornado II FP
Two seats in tandem amphibious floatplane version, intended for the US homebuilt category with a  wingspan. Out of production. Reported construction time is 350 hours. Twelve were reported flying in 2001.
Tornado MG II
Two seats in tandem version, with a  wingspan. The wing is detachable for storage or transport. No longer in production. Reported construction time is 400 hours. Eight were reported flying in 2001.
Tornado S
Two seats in tandem "stretched" fuselage version, intended for the US homebuilt and light-sport categories. It has a  wingspan. Still in production. Reported construction time is 300 hours. 55 reported flying in 2011.

Tornado SS
Two seats in tandem "super stretched" fuselage version, intended for the US homebuilt and light-sport categories. It features a longer and higher cockpit area with  more headroom that the Tornado II along with a bigger rear door and a full-sized back seat. It has a  wingspan. Still in production. Twenty reported as flying in 2011.

Specifications (Tornado 103)

See also

References

External links

1990s United States ultralight aircraft
Light-sport aircraft
Homebuilt aircraft
Single-engined pusher aircraft
High-wing aircraft
Tornado